Colombo city is divided into administrative sub-units. These were originally based on the feudal counties. The 15 divisions are listed below.

References 

Sri Lanka geography-related lists
Colombo